Shamishi() is a traditional Cypriot delicacy which is served usually during name days.

Information
Shamishi are semolina fried pies that have been produced in Cyprus since at least the 19th century and they are considered a traditional delicacy of the cuisine of Cyprus. Shamishi are known as a dessert that is served hot in special occasions such as weddings and local religious feasts usually along with loukoumades and water and it is a variety of fried pastry filled with halva and semolina.  In addition to halva and semolina, shamishi includes ingredients like flour, water, sugar, mastic, oil (corn or groundnut oil), salt, among others.

References

Cypriot cuisine
Pies
Desserts